Denmark uses the krone as its currency and does not use the euro, having negotiated the right to opt out from participation under the Maastricht Treaty of 1992. In 2000, the government held a referendum on introducing the euro, which was defeated with 46.8% voting yes and 53.2% voting no. The Danish krone is part of the ERM II mechanism, so its exchange rate is tied to within 2.25% of the euro.

Many political parties in Denmark favour the introduction of the euro and the idea of a second referendum has even been suggested several times since 2000. However, some important parties such as the Danish People's Party, Socialist People's Party and Red–Green Alliance do not support joining the currency. Public opinion surveys have shown fluctuating support for the single currency with majorities in favour for some years after the physical introduction of the currency. However, following the financial crisis of 2008, support began to fall, and in late 2011, support for the euro crashed in light of the escalating European sovereign debt crisis.

Denmark borders one eurozone member, Germany, and one EU member that is obliged to adopt the euro in the future but currently has no plans to do so, Sweden.

Current Status – ERM II 
In the ratification process of the Maastricht Treaty in 1992 the Danish government issued a referendum due to constitutional requirements. The Danish constitution requires 5/6 of the parliament's approval in the case of a transfer of sovereignty cf. art. 20 of Grundloven. If this requirement is not met, it will be necessary to host a referendum. The referendum resulted in 50.7% of the population voting against the ratification of the Maastricht Treaty, while only 49.3% voted in favour. The bourgeois coalition government of Denmark in 1992 consisting of Conservatives Agrarian Liberals and the Social democrats held approximately 80% of the seats in the Danish parliament (Folketing) and therefore believed that the referendum would easily get approved which was not the case.

The ratification of the Maastricht Treaty needed to be a unanimous decision by all the member states in the EU and the Danish "no" therefore posed a significant issue for the further integration process. Denmark was not the only country issuing a referendum for the ratification of the Maastricht Treaty. In France there was a small majority for the treaty and the Irish population also voted in favour of the ratification of the Treaty. The Danish "no" and the French "petit oui" are known in scholarly circles as the erosion of the permissive consensus regarding public support for European integration. In the years after Maastricht, the European integration faced more political scrutiny and pro-integration politicians could no longer rely on diffuse support

The solution to the lack of public support for the further European integration in Denmark is known as "the National Compromise". 7 out of 8 parties in the Danish parliament came together in support of this proposal. The main part of the National Compromise consisted of the request for 4 opt-outs: Union citizenship, Common Security and Defence, Justice and Home Affairs and participation in the last phase of the European Monetary Union. At the European Council summit 11–12 December 1992 in Edinburgh, the European leaders agreed to these four opt-outs.

Today Denmark instead participates in the Exchange Rate Mechanism II (ERM II) with a fluctuation band of ±2.25%. ERM II is a fixed exchange rate regime where the participating countries will have to follow the exchange rate level of the euro. The ERM II is a fixed exchange rate regime, in which the Danish currency and other participating countries' currency are pegged to the euro. Currently Denmark is one of the two countries participating in the ERM II (the other being Bulgaria).

This policy marks a continuation of the situation that existed from 1982 to 1999 with regard to the Deutsche Mark, which provided a similar anchor currency for the krone.

The krone has been part of the ERM II mechanism since 1 January 1999, when it replaced the original ERM. This implies it is required to trade within 2.25% either side of a specified rate of 1 euro equal to 7.46038 kroner (making the lower rate 7.29252 and the upper rate 7.62824). This band, 2.25%, is narrower than the 15% band used for most ERM II members. However, the exchange rate has kept within 0.5% of the defined rate, even less than the set limits.

In the ERM II the domestic central bank, Danmarks Nationalbank, and the ECB commits to the stability of the Danish currency within the given fluctuation band. When the Danish currency goes beyond the agreed upon limits, it is up to the domestic Central bank to intervene until the level is back within the fluctuation band. The ECB are obliged to intervene as well if the domestic Central bank is not able to.

The exchange rate of the euro is determined through the supply and demand of the Danish currency relative to euro. To avoid going beyond the fluctuation limits the domestic Central bank has two tools to adjust the money supply and exchange rate. The first tool is intervention through the purchase and selling currencies to adjust the available money level. The second tool is an adjustment of the interest rate.

The European Central Bank is conducting monetary policy independently from the national governments from the eurozone countries and has the aim of price stability. This means that the ERM II countries as well as EMU countries are giving up sovereignty in monetary policies to instead have price stability. When governments lose the autonomy in monetary policy, they lose the ability to respond to domestic economic shocks. Denmark's currency is pegged to the currency of the eurozone which is not an optimal currency area because the participating countries have asymmetric business cycles. Therefore, the monetary policy conducted in the eurozone is not necessarily beneficial for the economic situation in Denmark. The policy-aim of keeping a fixed exchange rate policy is to keep stable economic development and stable prices. Stable prices can be translated into low inflation. Fixed exchange rate policy based on the euro creates a framework for low inflation in the long run. The role of the ECB is set up in the Treaties and the monetary policy conducted should have price stability as its main aim. The ECB has defined price stability as a yearly growth in consumption prices under, but close to 2% in the middle to long run. The policy competences of the ECB are heavily influenced by the German Bundesbank policies and therefore have as main goal to have price stability and to be independent from national governments.

The loss of autonomy in monetary policy in Denmark is not significant, as Denmark has had a fixed exchange rate since the end of the Second World War and has participated in several monetary cooperation systems. Therefore, the adoption of ERM II is not a change in this sense or a loss of autonomy in monetary policy as it has been limited since the creation of the Bretton Woods system. Denmark has even gained more influence in the decision-making process through the EU and the ERM II than it had in previous monetary systems. Even though the Danish central bank governor does not participate in the governing council of the ECB, where the monetary policy and guidelines are formulated and adopted, Denmark have other channels of influence.  Even if Denmark did have a seat at the governing council of the ECB, it would not necessarily get more influence. Small member countries in the governing council of the ECB cannot generally expect that they will get an equivalent say compared to larger members due to informal rules and practices. Denmark's finance minister participates in the ECOFIN council in the Council of the European Union and therefore has some interactions with other eurozone countries and participates in the decision-making process in this institution. The tendency of ECOFIN topics increasingly being transferred and therefore more discussed in the Eurogroup meetings is therefore again a limitation for Danish influence on monetary decisions. Denmark does not participate in Eurogroup meetings but participates in preparatory meetings before, and meetings after the actual Eurogroup meeting. Denmark is interested in being kept informed as decisions in these meetings will also affect Denmark's economy. Other channels of influence and interaction with other officials can be done through ESCB framework, IMF, OECD and the ECB committees in which the Central Bank of Denmark also participates. This participation in the ECB committees is essential, as seen in the fact that its influence over monetary policy has improved compared to earlier systems.

The ECB can also use adjustment of interest rates to influence the exchange rate of the euro. An exchange rate is determined bilaterally relative to other currencies. If there is higher interest in one country relative to another, it will attract foreign capital and therefore the value of the currency will increase. Due to the fixed exchange rate regime in Denmark, the exchange rate level will always be close to the one of the eurozone's, and then the inflation rates will also be similar. A fixed exchange rate is a suitable tool to bring down inflation. A growth in economic activity can lead to inflation. Inflation in an economy is not necessarily hurtful as it can enable economic growth and create price and wage adjustment. There are several attractive elements of low levels of inflation while having too high levels of inflation in the long run will result in the increase of prices due to higher levels of employment. Higher levels of employment and increased prices will also lead to higher wages which will hurt firm's competitiveness on international markets. When firms are less competitive, they will lose market shares and it will lead to an increase of unemployment. In the end, an economy will be worse off with high unemployment just with higher prices and wages.

Besides maintaining low inflation levels, keeping a fixed exchange is also beneficial in other ways. It can reduce transaction costs and exchange rate uncertainty in international trade. The decrease in fluctuations of currency reduces uncertainty for traders and therefore stimulates international trade.

Status of the level of convergence of the Danish economy

History

Early monetary unions in Denmark (1873–1914) 
On 5 May 1873 Denmark with Sweden fixed their currencies against gold and formed the Scandinavian Monetary Union. Prior to this date Denmark used the Danish rigsdaler divided into 96 rigsbank skilling. In 1875, Norway joined this union. A rate of 2.48 kroner per gram of gold, or roughly 0.403 grams per krone was established. An equal valued krone of the monetary union replaced the three legacy currencies at the rate of 1 krone = ½ Danish rigsdaler = ¼ Norwegian speciedaler = 1 Swedish riksdaler. The new currency became a legal tender and was accepted in all three countries. This monetary union lasted until 1914 when World War I brought an end to it. But the name of the currencies in each country remained unchanged.

European Monetary System and pre-euro monetary co-operation
The collapse of the Bretton Woods system destabilised European markets and delayed the wish to have monetary integration in the member states of the European Economic Community. (Today EU). The Bretton Woods system was a system where exchange rates remained stable while having inflation under control. The dollar was pegged to the gold standard and the 14 European participating countries became convertible with the dollar. In the EU, further monetary cooperation and stable exchange rates were considered necessary to facilitate the creation of the internal market. The Werner Report was a draft proposal in the EU framework to have monetary cooperation to facilitate the internal market. This draft was based on a system where all participating countries’ currencies were already fully convertible, and when the Bretton Woods system collapsed, there were no central currency to peg the currencies on and therefore the idea for monetary integration was postponed. The first step toward a more integrated monetary system in Europe was the Basel agreement which created the European Currency Snake. The Smithsonian Agreement was an international agreement outside the EU framework which provided a new dollar standard to which the EEC currencies’ exchange rates were pegged to and where the European currency snake could fluctuate within. The currencies were though still allowed to fluctuate within 2.25% of the new dollar standard. The European Currency Snake entered into force on 24 April 1972 and was a tool to provide monetary stability. As the Currency Snake entered into force during the accession procedure of Denmark, United Kingdom and Ireland, those three currencies entered the system 1 May 1972. Shortly after, the Danish Crown came under speculative attacks and was forced to abandon the system but the joined again a few months later. The Smithsonian agreement collapsed in 1973 also due to speculative attacks and the US let the dollar float freely. This development made it unsustainable to maintain the European Currency Snake system. The snake cooperation was negatively impacted by exogenous pressures e.g. oil crises, the weakness of the dollar and differences of economic policy. Participants were forced to abandon the system and some even rejoined e.g. Denmark. In the last year of the operation of the snake, its area was only comprised Germany, the Benelux countries and Denmark.

The next attempt to create monetary stability in the EEC (today EU) was the European Monetary System which was established in 1979. In the beginning Denmark was 1 out of 8 participating countries in the EMS. The EMS created a system of European Currency Unit and an Exchange Rate Mechanism. The system set up a central rate and then bilateral rates were established between members. The EMS was similar to the Bretton Woods system but did not officially have an individual currency at the center, but Germany came to dominate the monetary system, due to Germany's size relative to the other participating countries and their central bank's success with controlling inflation.

The EMS provided a stable system though it was still possible to have adjustable exchange rates and the Danish government used any opportunity to devaluate the currency. The Danish economy experienced economic issues in the 1980s, and the government introduced several economic reforms. The economic issues were triggered by the world-wide recession in 1973-72 which were caused by a combination of the exhaustion of the Fordist production method of mass production and consumption and increase of oil prices due to the Arab-Israeli war. These exogenous shocks hurt the Danish economy hard and the recession caused inflationary pressures. Denmark saw a rise of inflation and unemployment. Inflation kept increasing due to attempts by firms to gain profit by raising prices, while a formal system of wage-price indexation increased levels of wages. The most significant reform was the decision to opt for a fixed exchange rate policy in 1982 and the government stopped devaluating the Danish currency. The currency was then pegged against the German D-mark.

The next step for European monetary integration was the entrance into the third stage of the EMU with the adoption of the Euro. Denmark would not enter the third phase of the EMU with the other EU countries due to the opt-out of the EMU and would therefore not adopt the common currency. In 1998 Denmark entered an agreement with the EU about participating in the Exchange Rate Mechanism II with a narrow fluctuation band of +/- 2.25 pct instead of the +/- 15pct which is the standard fluctuation band in the mechanism. This agreement was negotiated and finalised in the ECOFIN Council 25–27 September 1998. The main difference between ERM and ERM II is that the currencies participating in the ERM II system are no longer linked to bilateral parities with other participating currencies as they were in the original ERM system, but instead linked to the Euro.

Pre-eurozone documents (1992–1999) 
The Maastricht Treaty of 1992 required that EU member states join the euro. However, the treaty gave Denmark the right to opt out from participation, which they subsequently did following a referendum on 2 June 1992 in which Danes rejected the treaty.  Later that year Denmark negotiated the Edinburgh Agreement, under which Denmark was granted further opt-outs, which led to the Maastricht Treaty being accepted in a referendum on 18 May 1993. As the result, Denmark is not required to join the eurozone. Denmark did however participate in Stage 2 of EMU, which was considered the preparatory phase for the introduction of the euro. As a part of this process, the National Bank of Denmark participated in various aspects of the planning of the euro as it was still considered to be very important for future Danish economic policy. According to a history published by the central bank, "Firstly, it was important to create a solid framework for price stability in the euro area, making it an appropriate anchor for the Danish fixed-exchange-rate policy. Secondly, Denmark had an interest in developing an expedient framework for exchange rate cooperation between the euro area and the non-euro area member states. Thirdly, Denmark had a general interest in the formulation of the ground rules for Stage 3 of EMU to ensure that Denmark would be able to adopt the single currency at a later stage on the same terms as those applying to the initial euro area member states."

Euro referendum (2000) 

A referendum held on 28 September 2000 rejected membership of the eurozone. 87.6% of eligible voters turned out, with 46.8% voting yes and 53.2% voting no. Most political parties, media organisations and economic actors in Denmark campaigned in favour of adopting the euro. However, a couple of major parties campaigned against. Had the vote been favourable, Denmark would have joined the eurozone on 1 January 2002, and introduced the banknotes and coins in 2004. The immediate run-up to the referendum saw a significant weakening of the euro vs. the US dollar. Some analysts believe that this resulted in a general weakening of confidence in the new currency, directly contributing to its rejection. The bank believes that the debate was "coloured by the view that, on account of its fixed-exchange-rate policy, Denmark had already reaped some of the benefits of joining the euro area."

Possible second euro referendum 

On 22 November 2007, the newly re-elected Danish government declared its intention to hold a new referendum on the abolition of the four exemptions, including exemption from the euro, by 2011. It was unclear if people would vote on each exemption separately, or if people would vote on all of them together. However, the uncertainty, both in terms of the stability of the euro and the establishment of new political structures at the EU level, resulting first from eruption of the Financial Crisis and then subsequently from the related European government-debt crisis, led the government to postpone the referendum to a date after the end of its legislative term. When a new government came to power in September 2011, they outlined in their government manifest, that a euro referendum would not be held during its four-year term, due to a continued prevalence of this uncertainty.

As part of the European elections in 2014, it was argued collectively by the group of pro-European Danish parties (Venstre, Konservative, Social Democrats and Radikale Venstre), that an upcoming euro referendum would not be in sight until the "development dust had settled" from creation of multiple European debt crisis response initiatives (including the establishment of Banking Union, and the Commission's – still in pipeline – proposal package for creating a strengthened genuine EMU). When a new Venstre-led government came to power in June 2015, their government manifest did not include any plans for holding a euro referendum within their four-year legislative term.

There has been some speculation that the result of a Danish referendum would affect the Swedish debate on the euro.

Usage today 
The euro can be used in some locations in Denmark, usually in places catering to tourists, such as museums, airports and shops with large numbers of international visitors. However, change is usually given in kroner. Double krone-euro prices are used on all ferries going between Denmark and Germany.

On 10 January 2020, the 500 euro note was phased out in Denmark as part of the fight against money laundering and the financing of terrorism, meaning "handing out, handing in, exchanging, using as payment or transferring" the banknote in Denmark was made illegal. At the time, the banknote was worth 3,737 Danish kroner (DKK), more than three times the highest denomination of the domestic currency, the thousand-kroner banknote. The European Central Bank had stopped issuing the banknote in 2019, but was critical of the law. In an opinion published in February 2019, it argued that it conflicted with the principle of "sincere cooperation" set out in Article IV of the Treaty on European Union, and noted that no ban was planned for other high-value units of currency, such as the highest Swiss franc banknote, worth more than 6,500 DKK at the time.

Consequences of adoption of the euro
If Denmark were to adopt the euro, the monetary policy would be transferred from the Danmarks Nationalbank to the ESCB. In theory this would limit the ability of Denmark to conduct an independent monetary policy. However, a study of the history of the Danish monetary policy shows that, "while Denmark does not share a single currency, its central bank has always tracked changes made by the ESCB".

However, whilst outside the euro, Denmark does not have any representation in the ESCB direction.  This motivated the support for an adoption of the euro by former Prime Minister Anders Fogh Rasmussen: "De facto, Denmark participates in the euro zone but without having a seat at the table where decisions are made, and that's a political problem". Furthermore, the ESCB does not defend the Danish krone exchange rate. This is done by Danmarks Nationalbank, and the Danish government. In a crisis it can be tough for a small country to defend its exchange rate.

The expected practical advantages of euro adoption are a decrease of transaction costs with the eurozone, a better transparency of foreign markets for Danish consumers, and more importantly a decrease of the interest rates which has a positive effect on growth.

In the wake of the 2010 European sovereign debt crisis European leaders established the European Financial Stability Facility (EFSF) which is a special purpose vehicle aimed at preserving financial stability in Europe by providing financial assistance to eurozone states in difficulty. It has two parts. The first part expands a €60 billion stabilisation fund (European Financial Stabilisation Mechanism). All EU countries contribute to this fund on a pro-rata basis, whether they are eurozone countries or not.
The second part, worth €440 billion consists of government-backed loans to improve market confidence. All eurozone economies will participate in funding this mechanism, while other EU members can choose whether to participate. Unlike Sweden and Poland, Denmark has refused to help fund this portion of the EFSF.

Public opinion 

There have been numerous polls on whether Denmark should abolish the krone and join the euro. The actual wording of the questions have varied.  In 2008 and 2009 they generally, but not always, showed support among Danes for adopting the euro. Since 2011, polls have consistently shown majority opposition to joining the Eurozone.

Greens Analyseinstitut, a public opinion research company, has generally asked "How would you vote at a possible new referendum about participation of Denmark in the common currency?" ("Hvad ville du stemme ved en evt. ny folkeafstemning om Danmarks deltagelse i den fælles valuta?").

Public support for the euro in Denmark according to Eurobarometer polls

Danish autonomous territories 
The Faroe Islands currently use the Faroese króna, a localised version of the Danish krone but legally the same currency. Such notes are normally not accepted by shops in Denmark proper, or foreign exchange bureaus, but exchanged 1:1 in Danish banks. Greenland currently uses ordinary Danish kroner but has considered introducing its own currency, the Greenlandic krone in a system similar to that of the Faroese one. Both continue to use Danish coins.

It remains unclear if Greenland and the Faroe Islands would adopt the euro should Denmark choose to do so. Both are parts of the Kingdom of Denmark, but remain outside the EU. For this reason, they usually do not take part in EU related referendums.

Possible euro coin design 

Before Denmark's 2000 referendum on the issue, Danmarks Nationalbank and the Royal Mint were asked by the Ministry of Economics to propose possible designs for the future Danish euro coins. The suggested design was based on the designs of the Danish 10- and 20-krone coins, with Queen Margrethe II on the front, and the 25- and 50-øre coins, switching their back motif (a crown) to the front of the euro coins.

See also 
 
 Enlargement of the eurozone

Notes

References 

Economy of Denmark
Euro by country